Alan Boileau (born 25 June 1999) is a French cyclist, who currently rides for French amateur team VC Rouen 76.

Major results
2017
 6th Grand Prix Bob Jungels
2018
 4th Time trial, National Under-23 Road Championships
 8th Chrono des Nations U23
2019
 9th Overall Orlen Nations Grand Prix
1st Stage 1 (TTT)
2020
 4th Overall Ronde de l'Isard
2021
 1st Stage 3 Tour de Savoie Mont-Blanc
 4th Overall Tour du Rwanda
1st  Young rider classification
1st Stages 2, 3 & 5
2022
 1st Stage 7 Tour du Rwanda

References

External links

1999 births
Living people
French male cyclists
People from Morlaix
Sportspeople from Finistère
Cyclists from Brittany